Chauncey Jerome (1793–1868) was an American clockmaker in the early 19th century. He made a fortune selling his clocks, and his business grew quickly. However, his company failed in 1856, and he died in poverty.

Early life
He was born in Canaan in 1793; Chauncey Jerome was the son of Sarah Noble and Lyman Jerome, a blacksmith and nail-maker.

Career

Jerome began his career in Plymouth, making dials for long-case clocks. Jerome learned what he could about clocks, particularly clock cases, and then went to New Jersey to make seven-foot cases for clocks.

In 1816 he went to work for Eli Terry making "Patent Shelf Clocks," learning how to make previously handmade cases using machinery. Deciding to go into business for himself, Jerome began to make cases, trading them to Terry for wooden movements.

In 1822 Jerome moved his business to Bristol, opening a small shop with his brother Noble, producing 30-hour and eight-day wooden clocks. The company installed the first circular saw ever seen in Bristol.

By 1837 Jerome's company was selling more clocks than any of his competitors. A one-day wood-cased clock, which sold for six dollars, had helped put the company on the map. A year later his company was selling that same clock for four dollars.

By 1841 the company was showing an annual profit of a whopping $35,000, primarily from the sale of brass movements.

In 1842 Jerome moved his clock-case manufacturing operation to St. John Street in New Haven. Three years later, following a fire that destroyed the Bristol plant, Jerome relocated the entire operation to the Elm City. Enlarging the plant, the company soon became the largest industrial employer in the city, producing 150,000 clocks annually.

Because of his discovery of a method of stamping rather than using casting gears, Jerome was producing the lowest-priced clocks in the world at the time.

In 1850 Jerome formed the Jerome Manufacturing Co. as a joint-stock company with Benedict & Burnham, brass manufacturers of Waterbury. In 1853 the company became known as the New Haven Clock Co., producing 444,000 clocks and timepieces annually.

Jerome's future should have been secure but in 1855 he bought out a failed Bridgeport clock company controlled by P.T. Barnum, which wiped him out financially, leaving the Jerome Manufacturing Co. bankrupt. Jerome never recovered from the loss. By his own admission, he was a better inventor than businessman.

Traveling from town to town, Jerome took jobs where he could, often working for clock companies that had learned the business of clock making using Jerome's inventions. Returning to New Haven near the end of his life, he died, penniless, in 1868 at age 74.

Nevertheless, Jerome had made a historic contribution to his industry when he substituted brass works for wooden works, said to be "the greatest and most far-reaching contribution to the clock industry."

He made, and lost, a fortune selling his clocks and was perhaps the most influential and creative person associated with the American clock business during the mid-19th century. In addition he served as a legislator in 1834, a Presidential elector in 1852 and mayor of New Haven from 1854 to 1855.

Always humble, of his own life he wrote: "The ticking of a clock is music to me, and although many of my experiences as a business man have been trying and bitter, I have satisfaction of knowing that I have lived the life of an honest man, and have been of some use to my fellow men."

Early life

Jerome was born in Canaan, Connecticut, and later moved to Plymouth, Connecticut, where his father started a blacksmith shop. Jerome was a young boy when his father died, on October 5, 1804, and was forced to work in apprenticeship with salesmen. In one event, when walking around Bethlehem, Connecticut, to get to Torrington with his master, he noted how close he was to his mother in Plymouth, that night he made a run for it, running about twenty miles through woods, properties, farms, and in one case chased by dogs for a few miles, finally met his mother the next morning in Plymouth, the moment he contacted her, he realized it was morning and had to leave. He was victim of war at New Haven Fort, and when finished, he moved back to Plymouth to start an apprenticeship with Eli Terry.

Brave ideas, and the Journey to England

Jerome started manufacturing in Bristol off of West Street. He took note of all of the men who laughed at "Mr. Terry" for Terry's foolish ideas of selling a clock for a minor $14. Jerome came up with the idea of a rectangular shelf clock, brass in method, and sell-able for $1, the OG clock. Jerome sent his son, and a peddler who was a great friend of Jerome to England to sell his one dollar OG clocks. 

Several months went by, as store owners in England refused to buy Jerome's clocks. The shop owners understood that Eli Terry's pillar and scroll clocks were "garbage" and never worked (because wooden gears warp over seas, causing poor time keepers). Finally Jerome's son got a man to buy a clock for one dollar, and put it on a shelf - the next day, an English man walked in and saw it was still working, and proudly purchased the clock, this started a chain reaction, and the shop owner purchased 100 more clocks on the spot. 

Jerome's friend who supervised his son fell ill and died in England, followed by his son three months later.

References

External links

 
 
 The History of Chauncey Jerome, clockmaker
  History of the American Clock Business for the Past Sixty Years, and Life of Chauncey Jerome. Barnum's connection with the Yankee Clock Business, Publisher: F. C. Dayton, New Haven CT 1860
 Herbert Randall Survey of New Haven and Environs, 1880-1920  Chauncey Jerome Clock Company” in the CT State Library

1793 births
1868 deaths
Burials at Grove Street Cemetery
People from Canaan, Connecticut
People from Bristol, Connecticut
People from Plymouth, Connecticut
People from New Haven, Connecticut